Ahmad or AMAD may refer to:

Given name
Amad Al Hosni (born 1984), Omani footballer
Amad Diallo (born 2002), Ivorian footballer

Other
Activity median aerodynamic diameter (AMAD), distribution of particle sizes in the context of radiation protection
Airframe Mounted Accessory Drive, a multi-function gearbox used in jet-propelled aircraft
`Amad, village in western central Yemen

See also 
 Amand, Qazvin, a village in Qazvin Province, Iran